The Benton fireworks disaster was an industrial disaster that occurred on May 27, 1983, on a farm near Benton, Tennessee. A powerful explosion at an unlicensed fireworks factory producing illegal fireworks killed eleven and injured one, revealing the existence of the factory for the first time to law enforcement and the public.

The event gained national attention, covered by multiple media outlets, and triggered a two-year federal investigation that eventually led to the conviction of 21 people including the owner of the factory, a man who was considered to be the mastermind, and several others from multiple states who conspired to manufacture, transport, and/or allow the fireworks manufactured at the operation to be transported. Investigators determined the factory to have been the largest and most profitable known illegal fireworks operation in US history. The disaster was the deadliest event in US history involving illegal fireworks.

Background

It had been in operation since 1978 and was owned by Dan Lee Webb, aged 30 at the time of the disaster. In addition to the farm, Webb also owned a masonry business.

In December 1982, Webb, relative David Parks, and Howard Emmett Bramblett of nearby Ocoee began manufacturing M-80 and M-100 fireworks, which are banned by federal laws, in an old metal dairy barn on the farm. Bramblett, who owned a fireworks store in Benton and was an acquaintance of Webb, suggested that Webb begin the operation to combat financial problems. He reportedly taught Webb and Parks how to manufacture these fireworks, and connected them with  suppliers of materials and distributors in multiple states. He was considered by authorities to be the mastermind of the operation. Each fireworks case, which contained 1,440 individual fireworks, was sold for $160, with Bramblett, who was responsible for selling the fireworks, and John Franklin Miller, an Ohio fireworks manufacturer who was the primary supplier of materials and was responsible for soliciting customers, each receiving $10. Both men had a history of involvement with illegal fireworks, and had helped start other unlawful fireworks manufacturing operations, some of which exploded and killed workers. The factory employed several people, all of whom were reportedly related to Webb by blood or marriage and were out of work or underemployed at the time.

The two-story  barn that housed the factory consisted of a chemical mixing room on the first floor and an assembly room on the second floor. A former employee, whose mother and daughter were killed in the blast, stated that they were paid five dollars an hour in cash. Other relatives of the victims stated that the explosives were usually mixed by hand. Most employees were not aware of the dangers involved, and were not educated in safe working conditions. Between December 1982 and the date of the explosion, a total of 1,542,880 M-series fireworks were reported to have been manufactured at the factory and distributed to at least twelve states. The factory was determined to have accumulated a profit of about $1.25 million (equivalent to $ in ) during its operation. At its peak, the factory ran a minimum of six days a week, employed between 12 and 14 people, and produced between 100 and 130 cases of fireworks a week. At some point in the months prior to the explosion, the Polk County Sheriff's Office, Tennessee Bureau of Investigation (TBI), and the Bureau of Alcohol, Tobacco, and Firearms (ATF) had received word of an illegal fireworks manufacturing operation in the area, but were uncertain of the location.

Explosion and response 

On May 27, 1983, at approximately 9:15 AM, eleven workers were on duty when a cache of M-80 and M-100 explosives, flash powder, and other chemicals in the barn detonated, producing a powerful explosion and instantly killing all eleven workers and leveling the barn. The initial blast was followed over the next several minutes by several smaller blasts which witnesses described as sounding like shotguns, believed to have been from individual firework cases which were not detonated initially. The force of the blast shattered windows in several homes and other structures on nearby properties, which reportedly resulted in some neighbors receiving minor cut wounds. Nothing in the barn was left intact; all of the bodies had lost limbs and six were decapitated. Some were stripped by the force of the blast.

Several 911 calls were received moments after the initial blast, and within minutes, several police units arrived at the scene. Webb's wife Linda Sue, who was in the house at the time, fled before deputies arrived. Tommy Webb, who was critically injured, was taken to Erlanger Medical Center in Chattanooga with burns to about 35 percent of his body. Crews from the ATF and TBI arrived later to investigate the cause of the explosion. A Tennessee Emergency Management Agency (TEMA) crew, which included forensic anthropologist William M. Bass of the University of Tennessee in Knoxville, later arrived on the scene to identify the victims.

Investigation

Authorities were unable to determine the exact cause of the explosion, but concluded that it probably occurred as a result of explosives being mixed. The charred remains of an electric drill with a paint-stirring attachment were found, and the prevailing theory of the cause was that a spark from the drill's motor reached the mixture. Investigators concluded that other possible causes could have been sparking from an electrical wire, light fixture, or other appliance found at the site; and the scraping of boots on the floor. A cigarette lighter and three packs of cigarettes were also found at the site, which investigators determined could have caused the ignition of highly explosive vapors that were byproducts of the manufacturing process. TEMA later identified the dead as Faye Trentham (38), daughter Tanya Trentham (19), Doris Burns Longmire (29), David Nelce Webb (22, brother of Dan Lee Webb), Sybil Duggan (34), William Lee Burns (38), Beatrice Webb (51, mother of Dan Lee Webb), Dixie Freeman (21), David Parks (38) and his wife Judy (36), and Albert Kenneth Johnson (53, uncle of Dan Lee Webb).

Federal firearms agents also found a firework case eight to ten inches in length and three to four inches in diameter which, due to the large size, prompted Polk County deputies to speculate that some of the explosives were being purchased by people with criminal intents, such as terrorists. The undetonated explosives found were buried in the ground on the farm and later detonated in an open pit in nearby Copperhill having been used as evidence in Webb's trial. The farm was also found to be guarded by an elaborate security system which consisted of surveillance cameras, electric fences, alarms, guard dogs, and warning signs. Polk County Sheriff Frank Payne told reporters that he thought that they were gearing up for the Fourth of July.

Polk County police and multiple media outlets interviewed several people living near the farm. One man, who did not know about the fireworks operation, stated that he had wondered how the farm employed as many people as they did raising worms. One neighbor said that the blast shattered his windows and blew sheetrock off his ceiling. He had been told three months before by the Webbs that they did not want his children to go near the barn. Another neighbor said that he had heard one large blast followed by several smaller blasts over the course of about 20 minutes. The initial blast shattered glass in his living room. Sheriff Payne, a Vietnam War veteran, said that he "hadn't seen anything like this since Vietnam," and equated the explosion to a direct hit from a powerful bomb. Many of the friends and relatives of the victims interviewed stated that they did not know about the operation and were surprised to learn of it.

Aftermath 
Dan Lee Webb, who had been in Lansing, Illinois, delivering 86,400 M-80s during the event, surrendered at the Polk County Jail two days later. He was charged with eleven counts of involuntary manslaughter and illegally manufacturing and possessing explosives and jailed with a $300,000 bond. Linda Sue Webb was held on $50,000 bail as a material witness in order to ensure her appearance in court. She told her defense attorney that she believed that her husband was in the New York–New Jersey area at the time of the blast. Webb's brother Larry was also held as a material witness with a $50,000 bond, but released shortly thereafter. On April 19, 1984, Dan Lee Webb received a ten-year federal prison sentence for manufacturing explosives without a license. On May 1, 1984, he pleaded guilty to the manslaughter charges and received a ten-year prison sentence. He served it concurrently with the federal sentence and in addition was fined $10,000.

Bramblett was arrested two days later in nearby Chatsworth, Georgia, after cases of M-80 fireworks were found in two locations in Murray County. He was extradited to the Polk County Jail. A federal court jury convicted him and another man on May 3, 1984, of one count of manufacturing illegal fireworks, one of conspiracy, and one of storing the homemade explosives. He was sentenced to ten years in prison on July 2, 1984, for his role in a similar incident that occurred on May 24, 1983, in Rowesville, South Carolina, in which an explosion at an illegal fireworks operation killed two and injured five.

On August 27, 1985, twenty people from nine different states, including Bramblett and Miller, were indicted on federal charges for conspiring to supply materials, manufacture, sell, and distribute the illegal fireworks made at the farm to as many as twelve states including Tennessee, Georgia, North Carolina, South Carolina, Illinois, Michigan, Indiana, Ohio, Pennsylvania, and New York. Some of these people were also charged with transporting the fireworks or causing them to be transported. On June 25, 1986, Bramblett, Miller, and two of the others charged were found guilty by a jury of conspiracy in the operation. The sixteen others pled guilty. A few weeks later on July 7, a U.S. District Court Judge handed Bramblett a ten-year sentence for one count of participating in the illegal manufacture of explosives, concurrent ten-year terms for fifteen counts of causing illegal fireworks to be transported across state lines, and one count of illegally dealing in explosives. He served them concurrently with his 1984 sentence.

A chapter of American author Jon Jefferson's 2007 non-fiction book Beyond the Body Farm, coauthored with Bass, is about Bass' investigation of the event. A segment about the event is also included in Tennessee Tragedies: Natural, Technological, and Societal Disasters in the Volunteer State, a 2012 book by former TEMA official Allen R. Coggins. A chapter about the disaster is included in historian Dewaine A. Speaks' 2019 book Historic Disasters of East Tennessee. The land is now occupied by a rafting company by the name of Big Frog Expeditions.

See also
List of explosions
List of industrial disasters

References

External links
Illegal Fireworks Factory Explodes killing 11 people at YouTube - WDEF News 12
The Rockets' Red Glare, Bodies Bursting in Air: Dealing with a Mass Disaster - transcript from Beyond the Body Farm

Explosions in 1983
Disasters in Tennessee
Fireworks accidents and incidents
Illegal fireworks operations
1983 industrial disasters
1983 in Tennessee
Industrial fires and explosions in the United States
Polk County, Tennessee
May 1983 events in the United States
1983 crimes in the United States
Crimes in Tennessee
1983 fires in the United States
Fires in Tennessee